"Hi Diddle Riddle" was the first half-hour length episode of Batman to air, first broadcast on ABC, Wednesday January 12, 1966 and repeated on August 24, 1966 and April 5, 1967. It marked the first appearance of Frank Gorshin as The Riddler.

Plot synopsis
The series opens at the Republic of Moldavia exhibit, located at the Gotham City World's Fair, the Moldavian prime minister slices into the Moldavian friendship cake and unknowingly causes it to explode, releasing a concealed riddle. At the Gotham City Police Department, Police Commissioner James Gordon (Neil Hamilton) and Chief Miles O'Hara (Stafford Repp) suspect it to be the Riddler (Gorshin). They turn to Inspector Bash and all the other senior policemen, but all bow their heads for a moment of silence, they turn to a red phone ("I don't know who he is behind that mask of his, but I do know when we need him and we need him now!"). After a glimpse into the lives of Bruce Wayne (Adam West) and Dick Grayson (Burt Ward) as well as the opening credits, the riddle leads them as Batman and Robin to the Peale art gallery, where they catch the Riddler in the act of taking a cross from its proprietor Gideon Peale at gunpoint. They stop him with an explosive but learn to their horror that Riddler's gun was actually a lighter and the cross was his to begin with. Riddler whistles and some lawyers arrive bearing complaints in which the Riddler hands to Batman, who is slated to be sued for false arrest.

Batman and Robin must uncover the Riddler's plot before the case comes to trial or Batman will be forced to reveal his true identity in court, completely destroying his value as a crimefighter and stunting his career forever. However, Dick remembered that the Riddler said to look for two more riddles, and this clue inspires the Duo to get to the Batcave and closely examine the legal document.

Two hidden riddles in the legal documents lead Batman and Robin to the new "What a Way to Go-Go" discothèque. the Riddler informs the Mole Hill Mob that Batman has had time to solve his clue. As the Riddler and the Mole Hill Mob make their way through an underground corridor to the discothèque, his plan is again put into action. Being a minor, Robin is too young to enter the disco, so he waits outside in the Batmobile and monitors Batman on the Batscope while Batman dances the Batusi with the Riddler's assistant Molly. However, his orange juice had been spiked with a sleeping pill. Watching from outside, Robin attempts to help Batman, but falls victim to the Riddler's tranquilizer gun. Riddler tries to steal the Batmobile but accidentally triggers its antitheft rockets. He then tries to destroy the car but the flames are extinguished by its "Bat-o-stat Antifire Activator". Robin is carried away down a manhole by the Riddler and the Mole Hill Mob. Batman finds himself in no condition to pursue them and is forced to surrender his keys to the police at the most inopportune time.

Meanwhile, at the Riddler's hideout, Robin is strapped to a table as the Riddler, who is surrounded by Molly and the Mole Hill Mob, attempts to operate on the unconscious boy.

Cliffhanger text
 WILL ROBIN ESCAPE?
 CAN BATMAN FIND HIM IN TIME?
 IS THIS THE GHASTLY END OF OUR DYNAMIC DUO?
 ANSWERS...TOMORROW NIGHT! SAME TIME, SAME CHANNEL!
 ONE HINT--THE WORST IS YET TO COME!

Notes
 William Dozier said the primary inspiration for him to do this series was hearing reports of how Hugh Hefner would screen the 1949 Batman serials at the Playboy club for Playmates and visiting guests every Saturday night, and in a campy gesture, everyone would cheer the heroes and boo the villains.
 Batman is more of an outsider in this episode, as he would be forced to remove his mask in court. Later episodes ignore this and not only have Batman in court, but allow him to sub for the district attorney.
 In the cold open, Commissioner Gordon assembles his senior policemen and detectives to assess the situation; only after they unanimously confess their inability to challenge the Riddler does Gordon reluctantly decide to summon Batman. In later episodes, he and Chief O'Hara go to the Batphone without a second thought.
 Some sources credit the TV series makers as the creators of the Aunt Harriet character; she actually first appeared in the comic books in 1964, two years before the television show.
 The actor who played the villain would always be credited as the "Special Guest Villain".
 Each main villain had their own theme music.
 At the time this episode aired, Alfred Pennyworth was thought to be dead in the comics.
 The producers originally envisioned a 60-minute Batman series, but decided to trim it to 30-minute 2-parters as exhibition.
 This episode marks the first appearance of the Bat-Signal in the series.
 Batman's disco appearance and subsequent dance number gave rise to a brief dance craze over the Batusi. The dance never is identified by name by any character, but is called the Batusi by narrator William Dozier during the recap that opens episode 2.
 Variations between the pilot and regular series: opening theme is slightly different and the superimposed cliffhanger texts are angled. Also these are the only episodes of Batman's entire series run to feature a "Special Guest" credit (Jill St. John as Molly) preceding the ever-present "Special Guest Villain" credit.
 Cathy Ferrar said "Gleeps! It's Batman!" in episode #1, gained some notoriety and became known as the "Gleeps Girl". She returned in the episode "The Joker Trumps An Ace", with an additional five syllables to her role ("Crime is certainly rampant these days!").
 "Hi Diddle Riddle" was misprinted as "Hey Diddle Diddle" in a TV Guide close-Up detailing its telecast on ABC.
 Writer Lorenzo Semple Jr. wrote the screenplay for the 1966 Batman feature film.
 The footage first seen in "Hi Diddle Riddle" of The Dynamic Duo preparing to zoom out of The Batcave ("Atomic batteries to power, turbines to speed!" "Roger, ready to move out") is recycled in many later episodes and in the 1966 Batman movie.
 This is the only time that Alfred Pennyworth wears a tuxedo in the series. Also, Robin makes his only appearance wearing green cloth gloves (matching the fabric of his green tights); later episodes would have him wearing green leather gloves.
 The episode is based on "Remarkable Ruse of the Riddler" from Batman #171 (May 1965), written by Gardner Fox; in it, The Riddler, jealous of the attention Batman is giving The Mole Hill Mob, arranges a trap so Batman will apprehend the gang and give The Riddler The Caped Crusader's undivided attention.
 The scenes of The World's Fair used in this episode are actual footage taken at the 1964-5 New York World's Fair. The "Moldavian exhibit" was actually shot at the Pavilion of the Kingdom of Thailand at the World’s Fair. Both the exterior and the interior of the pavilion were seen in the episode, including the Thai architectural structure of the exterior and the mural depicting ancient Thai capitals in the hall. 
 The interior design of Commissioner Gordon's office is different from the way it is displayed in later episodes, so much that Batman and Robin exit through a door near the Commissioner's desk, as opposed to later episodes where they exit through a door at the opposite end of the office. Other sets feature minor changes such as the Wayne Manor study that has elements including an additional door added next to the fireplace and wood trim around the bookcase after the pilot.
 Bruce Wayne refers to his father's "law books", though in every other media portrayal, Bruce's father, Thomas Wayne, was a doctor, not a lawyer. This however does not mean Thomas wasn't a doctor, as it would not be unthinkable for a doctor to have law books since there are a great many pieces of legal knowledge that a doctor would have to be familiar with. This is also the first of only two episodes in which Wayne mentions that his parents were murdered; the other is the second-season episode "The Joker's Epitaph".
 After the cake explodes, the prime minister of Moldavia curses in German instead of Romanian, which is spoken in reality in his country. The "Republic of Moldavia" was only a fictional country (it seemed to be inspired by Moldova, a neighbor of Romania) and the scenes in the "Moldavian Pavilion" in both this episode and the next ("Smack in the Middle") were shot at the Pavilion of Thailand, a Southeast Asian Kingdom (not a European Republic).

References

 Batman (1966): Hi Diddle Riddle (1) - TV.com. Retrieved December 28, 2006.

External links
 

Batman (TV series) episodes
American television series premieres
1966 American television episodes
World's fairs in fiction